Sérgio Luiz da Penha (born August 20, 1959) is a Brazilian jiu-jitsu practitioner and instructor. He is most known for an epic fight against Rickson Gracie in the 1980s. Sergio currently is a coach for well known MMA fighters in Las Vegas such as Stephan Bonnar, Steve Cantwell, Anthony Njokuani among others. Sergio has just received one of the highest honors in Brazilian Jiu-Jitsu by obtaining his eighth degree red and white belt.

Penha is notable for being one of a very small number of Brazilian Jiu-Jitsu practitioners skilled enough to have completely bypassed brown belt, moving straight from purple to black belt.

Some sources claim that Penha may have been responsible for training Kazushi Sakuraba in Brazilian jiu-jitsu during his course of victories over various members of the renowned Gracie family. In an interview, Penha confirmed he had taught Sakuraba at the Takada Dojo, although he clarified it had been only 15 days in December 2001, long after Sakuraba had achieved his wins over the Gracie family. He also revealed the Takada Dojo fighters had been interested to learn "not secret methods and strategies specifically for beating jiu-jitsu," but "just basic techniques."

Instructor lineage 
Kano Jigoro → Tomita Tsunejiro → Mitsuyo "Count Koma" Maeda → Carlos Gracie → Reyson Gracie → Osvaldo Alves → Sergio Penha

See also
List of Brazilian Jiu-Jitsu practitioners

References

External links
 Sergio Penha - Brazilian Jiu-Jitsu
 Blog for Sergio Penha - Brazilian Jui-Jitsu
 GTR Dojo Jui-Jitsu
 On the Mat - Interview with Oswaldo Alves

1959 births
Living people
American male mixed martial artists
American practitioners of Brazilian jiu-jitsu
People from the Las Vegas Valley
Sportspeople from Rio de Janeiro (city)
People awarded a coral belt in Brazilian jiu-jitsu